Abhayathilakarathnaramaya (Sinhalaː අභයතිලකාරත්නරාමය) (or Kuruvita Purana Vihara) is an ancient Buddhist temple in Kuruwita, Sri Lanka. The temple is located on Kuruwita - Erathna road, approximately 150m from Colombo - Batticaloa highway. The temple has been formally recognized by the Government as an archaeological site in Sri Lanka.

See also
 List of Archaeological Protected Monuments in Sri Lanka

References

Buddhist temples in Ratnapura District
Archaeological protected monuments in Ratnapura District